Statistics of Primera Fuerza in season 1929-30.

Overview
It was contested by 8 teams, and Club España won the championship.

League standings

Moves
After this season México FC retired and Leonés joined.
The league was suspended for the 1930-31 season due to teams building new Parks to play in.

Top goalscorers
Players sorted first by goals scored, then by last name.

References
Mexico - List of final tables (RSSSF)

1929-30
1929–30 in Mexican football
1929–30 domestic association football leagues